Henuttawy ("Mistress of the Two Lands") was an ancient Egyptian princess of the 19th Dynasty.

Biography 

Henuttawy was a daughter of Pharaoh Ramesses II and the Great Royal Wife Nefertari and half-sister of Merneptah. She is seventh on the lists of Ramesses's daughters and the second of two daughters whose mother is certain to have been Nefertari.

Her statue stands in the small Abu Simbel temple, built for Nefertari. The children of Nefertari are usually identified on the basis of this temple: the princes Amunherkhepeshef, Pareherwenemef, Meryre and Meryatum and the princesses Meritamen and Henuttawy. Henuttawy is not depicted on the facade of the large Abu Simbel temple, where the first two sons and the six eldest daughters of Ramesses are shown, along with Nefertari and Queen Mother Tuya.

Tomb QV73
Her tomb in the Valley of the Queens, QV73 is not far from those of other members of Ramesses's family (QV68 – Meritamen, QV71 – Bintanath, QV75 – Henutmire); it is between the tombs of her elder half-sister Bintanath and the 20th dynasty queen Duatentopet (QV74).

The tomb may have been carved for a generic princess and after Henuttawy's death was adapted for her. In some areas of the tomb the cartouches are blank, but in the main burial chamber faint traces of her name have been recorded.  The tomb consists of a burial chamber with two pillars and two side rooms. The decorations resemble those in the tomb of Nefertari.

See also
 List of children of Ramesses II

Sources

13th-century BC Egyptian women
Princesses of the Nineteenth Dynasty of Egypt
Ramesses II
Children of Ramesses II